= EverYoung (Korean company) =

Company in Seoul, South Korea

- Type: Social enterprise
- Founded: 2013
- Founder: Chung Eunsung
- Headquarters: Seoul, South Korea
- Number of employees: 420
- Website: http://www.everyoungkorea.com

EverYoung (full name EverYoung Korea Corp) is a social enterprise based in Seoul, South Korea that only employs people over the age of 55. The company was founded in 2013 to monitor content on blogging platforms. The company was founded by 56 year old executive Mr Chung Eunsung. The company offers perks such as onsite blood pressure machines and four hour work shifts. The company has 4 offices and employs 420 seniors. Their oldest employee is 83 years old.
